Sir Charles William Chadwick Oman,  (12 January 1860 – 23 June 1946) was a British military historian. His reconstructions of medieval battles from the fragmentary and distorted accounts left by chroniclers were pioneering. Occasionally his interpretations have been challenged, especially his widely copied thesis that British troops defeated their Napoleonic opponents by firepower alone. Paddy Griffith, among modern historians, claims that the British infantry's discipline and willingness to attack were equally important.

Early life
Oman was born in Muzaffarpur district, India, the son of a British planter, and was educated at Winchester College and at the University of Oxford, where he studied under William Stubbs. Here, he was invited to become a founding member of the Stubbs Society, which was under Stubbs's patronage.

Career
In 1881 he was elected to a Prize Fellowship at All Souls College, where he remained for the rest of his academic career. He was elected the Chichele Professor of Modern History at Oxford in 1905, in succession to Montagu Burrows. He was also elected to the FBA that year, and served as president of the Royal Historical Society (1917–1921), the Numismatic Society and the Royal Archaeological Institute.

Among his teaching activities at Oxford, he taught the special subject in military history with C.T. Atkinson of Exeter College that focused on the Peninsular War.

Oman's academic career was interrupted by the First World War, during which he was employed by the government's Press Bureau and the Foreign Office.

Oman was the Conservative Member of Parliament for the University of Oxford constituency from 1919 to 1935, and was knighted KBE in the 1920 civilian war honours list.

The parody history book 1066 and All That, published in 1930, includes the dedication "Absit Oman", a distortion of the Latin phrase "Absit omen".  It can be translated as "may Oman be absent", reflecting the prominence of Oman among English historians at the time.

Honours
He became an honorary fellow of New College in 1936, and received the honorary degrees of DCL (Oxford, 1926) and LL.D (Edinburgh, 1911 and Cambridge, 1927).  He was awarded the Medal of the Royal Numismatic Society in 1928. He died at Oxford aged 86.

Children
Two of Oman's children became authors. His daughter Carola Oman CBE was a writer of history, biography, and fiction for adults and children, including a retelling of the Robin Hood legend and biographies of Admiral Lord Nelson and Lieutenant-General Sir John Moore. His son Charles C. Oman wrote several volumes on British silverware and similar houseware, worked as a Keeper of the Department of Metalwork in the Victoria and Albert Museum, and was active in the Folklore Society (and was in turn father to Julia Trevelyan Oman).

Works

1880s
 The Art of War in the Middle Ages (1885)
 "The Anglo-Norman and Angevin Administrative System (1100–1265)", in Essays Introductory to the Study of English Constitutional History (1887)
 A History of Greece From the Earliest Times to the Death of Alexander the Great (1888; 7th ed., 1900; 8th ed., rev., 1905)

1890s
 Warwick the Kingmaker (1891)
 The Story of the Byzantine Empire (1892)
 The Dark Ages 476–918, Period I of Periods of European History (1893; 5th ed. 1905)
 A History of England (1895; 2nd ed. 1919)
 A History of the Art of War in the Middle Ages, Vol. I: A.D. 378–1278 (1898; 2nd ed. 1924)
 A History of the Art of War in the Middle Ages, Vol. II: A.D. 1278–1485 (1898; 2nd ed. 1924)
 England and the Hundred Years War, 1327–1485 A.D. (1898), No. III of The Oxford Manuals of English History, Charles Oman, ed.
 "Alfred as a Warrior", in Alfred The Great, Alfred Bowker, ed. (1899)
 Reign of George VI, 1900-1925. A Forecast Written in the Year 1763 (preface and notes) (1763; republished 1899)

1900s
 England in the Nineteenth Century (1900)
 A History of the Peninsular War, Vol. I: 1807–1809 (1902)
 Seven Roman Statesmen of the Later Roman Republic (1902)
 A History of the Peninsular War, Vol. II: Jan. 1809-Sep. 1809 (1903)
 "The Peninsular War, 1808–14", in The Cambridge Modern History, Vol. IX, Napoleon (1906)
 "The Hundred Days, 1815", in The Cambridge Modern History, Vol. IX, Napoleon (1906)
 "Inaugural lecture on the study of history" (1906), in Oxford Lectures on University Studies, 1906–1921 (1924)
 The Great Revolt of 1381 (1906) (See The Great Revolt of 1381.)
 The History of England from the Accession of Richard II. to the Death of Richard III. (1377–1485), Vol. IV of The Political History of England (1906), William Hunt & Reginald Poole, ed.
 A History of the Peninsular War, Vol. III: Sep. 1809 – Dec. 1810 (1908)

1910s
 A History of England Before the Norman Conquest (1910; 8th ed. 1937), Vol. I of A History of England in Seven Volumes (1904–), Charles Oman, ed.
 A History of the Peninsular War, Vol. IV: Dec. 1810 – Dec. 1811 (1911)
 Wellington's Army, 1809–1814 (1912)
 A History of the Peninsular War, Vol. V: Oct. 1811 – Aug. 1812 (1914)
 The Outbreak of the War of 1914–18: A Narrative Based Mainly on British Official Documents (1919)

1920s
 A History of the Peninsular War, Vol. VI: Sep. 1812 – Aug. 1813 (1922)
 The Unfortunate Colonel Despard & Other Studies (1922)
 Castles (1926)
 "The Duke of Wellington", in Political Principles of Some Notable Prime Ministers of the Nineteenth Century, Fossey John Cobb Hearnshaw, ed. (1926)
 Studies in the Napoleonic Wars (1929)

1930s
 A History of the Peninsular War, Vol. VII: Aug. 1813 – Apr. 1814 (1930)
 The Coinage of England (1931)
 Things I Have Seen (1933)
 "The Necessity for the Reformation" (1933) (public lecture)
 A History of the Art of War in the Sixteenth Century (1937)
 The Sixteenth century (1937)
 On the Writing of History (1939)

1940s
 Memories of Victorian Oxford and of Some Early Years (1941)
 The Lyons Mail (1945)

References

External links
 
 
 
 

1860 births
1946 deaths
People educated at Winchester College
Alumni of the University of Oxford
British military historians
Anglo-Indian people
Historians of the Napoleonic Wars
Fellows of All Souls College, Oxford
Fellows of New College, Oxford
Fellows of the British Academy
Presidents of the Royal Numismatic Society
Knights Commander of the Order of the British Empire
Members of the Parliament of the United Kingdom for the University of Oxford
Conservative Party (UK) MPs for English constituencies
UK MPs 1918–1922
UK MPs 1922–1923
UK MPs 1923–1924
UK MPs 1924–1929
UK MPs 1929–1931
UK MPs 1931–1935
Presidents of the Royal Historical Society
Chichele Professors of Modern History
People from Muzaffarpur district
Presidents of the Royal Archaeological Institute